Carol Marcel Vadnais (September 25, 1945 – August 31, 2014) was a Canadian professional ice hockey defenceman who played 17 seasons in the National Hockey League (NHL) from 1966–67 until 1982–83. Vadnais won the Stanley Cup twice during his career, in 1968 with the Montreal Canadiens and again in 1972 with the Boston Bruins.

Playing career
Originally a forward, Vadnais was shifted to defence in his final year of junior hockey with the Montreal Jr. Canadiens. In his first NHL training camp, he made the Montreal Canadiens lineup for the 1966-67 season. While the Canadiens were initially successful in not exposing Vadnais to the 1967 expansion draft, he was left unprotected after the 1967-68 season and would be claimed by the expansion Oakland Seals in the June 1968 intra-league draft. He became the Seals' captain at the beginning of the 1971-72 season but was traded mid-season.

On February 23, 1972, Vadnais was acquired by the Boston Bruins in an attempt to bolster their blueline for a Stanley Cup run. The Bruins outbid Vadnais' old club, the Canadiens, to secure his services. The move paid off and Vadnais headed the Bruins' second defence pairing behind Bobby Orr's first unit, which helped the Bruins capture the 1972 Stanley Cup.

Vadnais was involved in the November 7, 1975 blockbuster trade that sent him along with star forward Phil Esposito to the New York Rangers for Jean Ratelle and Brad Park.  Vadnais went on to play seven seasons for the Rangers and one for the New Jersey Devils before retiring in 1983.  Along with Wayne Cashman of the Bruins and Serge Savard of the Winnipeg Jets, he was one of the final NHL players to participate in the pre-expansion Original Six era (the Bruins and Jets both made the playoffs, extending Cashman's and Savard's careers by that long).

Vadnais played 1,087 career NHL games, scoring 169 goals and 418 assists for 587 points, as well as adding 1,813 penalty minutes. In his best statistical season (1974–75), he scored 18 goals and set career highs with 56 assists and 74 points. Vadnais participated in six NHL All-Star Games and was a member of Team Canada at the 1976 Canada Cup (but didn't play in the tournament) and 1977 World Ice Hockey Championships.

Coaching career
Vadnais joined the Rangers' coaching staff as an assistant for the 1983–84 and 1984-85 seasons.  This was followed by one season as the head coach of the Quebec Major Junior Hockey League's Verdun Junior Canadiens, after which Vadnais left hockey for good.

Personal
After hockey, Vadnais worked as a real estate agent in the Montreal area. His wife, Raymonde, died of cancer in 2004; they had one daughter, Michele.

Vadnais died of cancer on August 31, 2014, at the age of 68.

Achievements
 In the 2009 book 100 Ranger Greats, was ranked No. 52 all-time of the 901 New York Rangers who had played during the team's first 82 seasons 

 Stanley Cup champion (1968, 1972)
 Selected to National Hockey League All-Star Game (1969, 1970, 1972, 1975, 1976, 1978)

Career statistics

Regular season and playoffs

International

See also
List of NHL players with 1000 games played

References

External links

1945 births
2014 deaths
Boston Bruins players
California Golden Seals players
Canadian ice hockey coaches
Canadian ice hockey defencemen
Deaths from cancer in Quebec
Houston Apollos players
Ice hockey people from Montreal
Montreal Canadiens players
Montreal Junior Canadiens players
National Hockey League All-Stars
New Jersey Devils players
New York Rangers coaches
New York Rangers players
Oakland Seals players
Stanley Cup champions
Verdun Junior Canadiens coaches